The 2010 Utah gubernatorial special election took place November 2, 2010. It was a special election to fill the remainder of Governor Jon Huntsman's term. Huntsman resigned on August 11, 2009, to become United States Ambassador to China. Lieutenant Governor Gary Herbert assumed the governorship and went on to defeat his Democratic opponent, Salt Lake County Mayor Peter Corroon, in the 2010 election.

Candidates

Democratic
Peter Corroon, Mayor of Salt Lake County

Republican

Nominee
Gary Herbert, Governor

Defeated at convention
Richard Martin
Daniel Van Oaks, Jr.

Libertarian
W Andrew McCullough

Other
Farley Anderson

General election

Predictions

Polling

Results

See also
 2010 United States gubernatorial elections
 Dan Jones & Associates

References

External links
State of Utah Elections Office
Utah Governor Candidates at Project Vote Smart
Campaign contributions for 2010 UT Governor from Follow the Money
Utah General Election graph of multiple polls from Pollster.com
Election 2010: Utah Governor from Rasmussen Reports
Utah Governor Special Election - Herbert vs. Corroon from Real Clear Politics
2010 Utah Governor's Race from CQ Politics
Race Profile in The New York Times
Official campaign sites (Archived)
Peter Corroon for Governor
Gary Herbert for Governor
Farley Anderson for Governor
Andrew McCullough for Governor

Utah
Gubernatorial
2010
Gubernatorial 2010
Utah 2010